Campo Grande is a square located in the southern zone of Salvador, Bahia, Brazil.

Transport in Salvador, Bahia